North Carolina Highway 705 (NC 705) is a primary state highway in the U.S. state of North Carolina.  The route is marked as the Pottery Highway or Pottery Road and as a North Carolina Scenic Byway due to the large number of potters in and surrounding Seagrove.

Route description

NC 705 begins at a northern terminus near Seagrove, North Carolina at I-73/I-74US 220 exit 45.  It passes through Seagrove, crossing US 220 Alternate.  The highway travels southeasterly in Randolph County where it passes through the community of Whynot southeast of Seagrove.

The route passes into Moore County just north of the communities of Dover and Westmoore.  It continues southwesterly through Robbins, North Carolina where it junctions with NC 24/NC 27 just south of Robbins at the community of Garners Store.  From the junction, the route turns southeasterly and continues through the community of Zion Grove until it ends in the community of Elberta near Eagle Springs, North Carolina.

Pottery Road
The route takes the traveler through historic areas of North Carolina which have been making and selling hand-turned or "hand-thrown" pottery since the eighteenth century. The area potters produce traditional functional pottery as well as artistic pottery.

The Cole, Auman, Owen, Teague, and Albright families are eighth- and ninth-generation potters in Seagrove and the surrounding areas.

Some of the oldest, historic pottery locations still in operation include the "Original" Owens Pottery founded in 1895 and Jugtown Pottery founded in 1921. Jugtown is listed on the National Register of Historic Places.

Plank Road
Portions of the route are part of the Fayetteville and Western Plank Road connecting the city of Fayetteville, North Carolina with Moravian settlements near Bethania, North Carolina (northwest of Winston-Salem).

History

Junction list

See also
 North Carolina Bicycle Route 6 - Concurrent with NC 705 from Old Plank Road in Seagrove to I-73/I-74/US 220

References

External links

 
 NCRoads.com: N.C. 705
https://discoverseagrove.com/

American potters
Transportation in Moore County, North Carolina
Transportation in Randolph County, North Carolina
705